The kicked rotator, also spelled as kicked rotor, is a paradigmatic model for both Hamiltonian chaos (the study of chaos in Hamiltonian systems) and quantum chaos. It describes a free rotating stick (with moment of inertia ) in an inhomogeneous "gravitation like" field that is periodically switched on in short pulses. The model is described by the Hamiltonian

 ,

Classical properties

Stroboscopic dynamics 
The equations of motion of the kicked rotator writeTheses equations show that between two consecutive kicks, the rotator simply moves freely: the momentum  is conserved and the angular position growths linearly in time. On the other hand, during each kick the momentum abruptly jumps by a quantity , where  is the angular position near the kick. It is usually more convenient to introduce dimensionless momentum , time  and kicking strength  to reduce the dynamics to the single parameter mapknown as Chirikov standard map, with the caveat that is not periodic as in the standard map.

Transition from integrability to chaos 
The kicked rotator is a prototype model to illustrate the transition from integrability to chaos in Hamiltonian systems and in particular the Kolmogorov–Arnold–Moser theorem. In the limit , the system describes the free motion of the rotator, the momentum is conserved (the system is integrable) and the corresponding trajectories are straight lines in the  plane (phase space), that is tori. For small, but non-vanishing perturbation , instabilities and chaos starts to develop. Only quasi-periodic orbits (represented by invariant tori in phase space) remain stables, while other orbits become unstables. For larger , invariant tori are eventually destroyed by the perturbation.

Diffusion in momentum direction 
For , chaotic unstable orbits are no longer constraints by invariant tori in the momentum direction and can explore the full phase space. For , the particle after each kicks typically moved over a large distance, which strongly modifies the amplitude and sign of the following kick. At long time enough, the particle as thus been submitted to a series of kicks with quasi-random amplitudes. This quasi-random walk is responsible for a diffusion process in the momentum direction  (where the average runs over different initial conditions).

More precisely, after  kicks, the momentum  of a particle with initial momentum  writes   (obtained by iterating  times the standard map). Corrections coming from neglected correlation terms can actually be taken into account, leading to the improved expressionwhere  is the Bessel function of first kind.

The quantum kicked rotator

Stroboscopic dynamics 
The dynamics of the quantum kicked rotator (with wave function ) is governed by the time dependent Schrödinger's equation

 

As for classical dynamics, a stroboscopic point of view can be adopted by introducing the time propagator over a kicking period  (that is the Floquet operator) so that . After a careful integration of the time-dependent Schrödinger's equation, one finds that  can be written as the product of two operatorsWe recover the classical interpretation: the dynamics of  the quantum kicked rotor between two kicks is the succession of a free propagation during a time  followed by a short kick. This simple expression of the Floquet operator  (a product of two operators, one diagonal in momentum basis, the other one diagonal in angular position basis) allows to easily numerically solve the evolution of a given wave function using  split-step method.

 

Dynamical localization 
It has been discovered that the classical diffusion is suppressed in the quantum kicked rotator.  It was later understood that this is a manifestation of a quantum dynamical localization effect that parallels Anderson localization. There is a general argument that leads to the following estimate for the breaktime of the diffusive behavior

 

Where  is the classical diffusion coefficient. The associated localization scale in momentum is therefore .

Link with Anderson tight-binding model 

In the quantum kicked rotator it can be shown, that the plane wave  with quantized momentum  play the role of the lattice sites states. The full mapping to the Anderson tight-binding model goes as follow (for a given eigenstates of the Floquet operator, with quasi-energy )Dynamical localization in the quantum kicked rotator then actually takes place in the momentum basis.

The effect of noise and dissipation 
If noise is added to the system, the dynamical localization is destroyed, and diffusion is induced.  This is somewhat similar to hopping conductance. 
The proper analysis requires to figure out how the dynamical correlations that are responsible for the localization effect are diminished.

Note that . The same calculation recipe holds also in the quantum mechanical case, and also if noise is added.

In the quantum case, without the noise, the area under  is zero (due to long negative tails), while with the noise a practical approximation is  where the coherence time  is inversely proportional to the intensity of the noise.  Consequently, the noise induced diffusion coefficient is

 

Also the problem of quantum kicked rotator with dissipation (due to coupling to a thermal bath) has been considered. There is an issue here how to introduce an interaction that respects the angle periodicity of the position  coordinate, and is still spatially homogeneous. In the first works   
 a quantum-optic type interaction has been assumed that involves a momentum dependent coupling.  Later a way to formulate a purely position dependent coupling, as in the Calderia-Leggett model, has been figured out, which can be regarded as the earlier version of the DLD model.

Experimental realization with cold atoms 
The first experimental realizations of the quantum kicked rotator have been achieved by Mark G. Raizen group in 1995, later followed by the Auckland group, and have encouraged a renewed interest in the theoretical analysis.  In this kind of experiment, a sample of cold atoms provided by a magneto-optical trap interacts with a pulsed standing wave of light. The light being detuned with respect to the atomic transitions, atoms undergo a space-periodic conservative force. Hence, the angular dependence is replaced by a dependence on position in the experimental approach. Sub-milliKelvin cooling is necessary to obtain quantum effects: because of the Heisenberg uncertainty principle, the de Broglie wavelength, i.e. the atomic wavelength, can become comparable to the light wavelength. For further information, see.
Thanks to this technique, several phenomena have been investigated, including the noticeable:
 quantum Ratchets;
 the Anderson transition in 3D.

See also
 Circle map

References

External links
 Scholarpedia entry

Quantum mechanics
Articles containing video clips
Chaotic maps